The 5th Virginia Regiment was raised on December 28, 1775, at Richmond, Virginia, for service with the U.S. Continental Army. The regiment saw action at the Battle of Trenton, Battle of Princeton, Battle of Brandywine, Battle of Germantown, Battle of Monmouth and the Siege of Charleston. The regiment was joined to the 3rd Virginia Regiment on May 12, 1779. General William Russell and Col. Josiah Parker were two of its commanders.

Among the negroes serving in the 5th Virginia was James Due. Due was a soldier under the command of Captain John Hawkins of Maryland. James Due was captured at Elizabethtown, NJ and served eleven months as a prisoner of war. He obtained a pension in 1821.

List of commanders
 Colonel William Peach from 13 February 17767 May 1776
 Colonel Charles Scott from 7 May 17761 April 1777
 Colonel Josiah Parker from 1 April 177712 July 1778
 Colonel William Russell from 14 September 177812 May 1779

See also
3rd Virginia Regiment

References

External links
Bibliography of the Continental Army in Virginia compiled by the United States Army Center of Military History

Virginia regiments of the Continental Army
Military units and formations established in 1775
Military units and formations disestablished in 1779